Astove Island Airport  is an airstrip serving Astove Island in Seychelles.

See also

 List of airports in Seychelles
 Transport in Seychelles

References

External links
OpenStreetMap - Astove Island

Airports in Seychelles